KELS-LP (104.7 FM), also known as "The Pirate", is a low-power radio station licensed to Greeley, Colorado, United States. The station serves the Greeley - Ft. Collins area and is currently owned by Plymouth Gathering, Inc.

In early 2011, the station aired a commentary regarding Martin Luther King Jr. that caused national controversy.  The commentary was based on information provided by a listener regarding moral concerns with the civil rights leader. Though the commentary was reported to be generally factual and has been aired in previous years, the controversy developed because the station owner, Brett Reese was, at the time, a Greeley School Board member. In May 2011 Reese was publicly censured by the school board for being intoxicated at a board meeting and for allegedly inappropriately touching a teacher. (Www.denverpost.com) Reese resigned from the school board in February 2012.(Www.greeleytribune.com)
Reese has repeatedly denied any racial intent and has voiced his support of the civil rights movement. Reese says that his intent is that the truth should be known regarding those that are held up as role models.

References

External links
 
FCC Fines KELS-LP non-profit station $15,000 for airing advertising as underwriting over 1600 times

ELS-LP
Greeley, Colorado
ELS-LP
Politics and race in the United States
Radio stations established in 2004
2004 establishments in Colorado